Kiribati competed in the Summer Olympic Games for the first time at the 2004 Summer Olympics in Athens, Greece, from August 13–29, 2004. The country sent three representatives to the Games: two in athletics and one in weightlifting. As of 2012, Meamea Thomas has the best finish of any I-Kiribati athlete in Olympic history. Kiribati did not win medals at these Games.

Background
The 2004 Olympics were Kiribati's first Games, along with East Timor. Kiribati had interest in Olympic participation in the 1980s, and the country later formed their National Olympic Committee (NOC) in 2002, which was recognized by the International Olympic Committee (IOC) in 2003.

Weightlifter Meamea Thomas was the flagbearer for the Opening Ceremonies. During the ceremony, the men wore grass skirts with braided hair belts. Kaitinano Mwemweata wore a skirt of coconut leaves with a woven grass top. For the closing ceremonies, Mwemweata was the flagbearer.

Athletics 

Both athletes did not know they were going to compete until a couple of weeks prior to the Olympics. A competitor broke their foot, and another's fear of flying prevented their trip to the Games, opening up two spots for I-Kiribati athletes. The I-Kiribati athletes had to travel to Australia early so they could learn how to use starting blocks.

Kakianako Nariki's competed in his first and only Olympics. Nariki was afraid of being disqualified because there were false starts in his heat. He ended up finishing seventh in his heat, with a time of 11.62, beating disqualified athlete Marc Burns.

Kaitinano Mwemweata competed in the women's 100 meter dash. She finished the race with a time of 13.07 seconds, a personal best she was very excited about. She finished seventh in her heat, failing to advance to the next round.

Key

Men

Women

Weightlifting 

Although Meamea Thomas won gold in the men's −85 kg in the Oceania Championships, he did not automatically qualify and later received a wildcard entry.

Thomas competed in the men's −85 kg weightlifting competition, finishing 17th in the snatch and 13th in the clean and jerk. Overall, he finished 13th out of 21 competitors. As of the 2012 Olympics, Meamea Thomas has the highest finish of any I-Kiribati athlete in Olympic history.

References

External links
Official Report of the XXVIII Olympiad

Nations at the 2004 Summer Olympics
2004
Summer Olympics